18 Wheels of Justice is an American crime drama series that aired from 2000 to 2001 on TNN. It starred Lucky Vanous as federal agent Michael Cates (posing as a truck driver, with a Kenworth T2000 semi-truck), and G. Gordon Liddy as Jacob Calder, the crime boss Cates was chasing. The episodes followed a format not unlike The Incredible Hulk or The Fugitive or The Rebel, in that the wandering Cates would meet and interact with different people and help them with their particular problems before moving on. The series was distributed by King World Productions, and was filmed at Stu Segall Productions in San Diego.

Cast
 Lucky Vanous as Michael Cates / Chance Bowman
 G. Gordon Liddy as Jacob Calder
 Billy Dee Williams as Burton Hardesty
 Lisa Thornhill as Celia "Cie" Baxter

Episodes

Season 1 (2000)

Season 2 (2001)

References

External links

Television series by CBS Studios
2000 American television series debuts
2001 American television series endings
2000s American crime drama television series
The Nashville Network original programming
English-language television shows
Television shows based on books
Television shows set in San Diego